Dromore is a civil parish in County Down, Northern Ireland. It is situated mainly in the historic baronies of Iveagh Lower, Lower Half, with one townland in the barony of Iveagh Lower, Upper Half.

Settlements
The civil parish contains the following settlements:
Dromore
Kinallen

Townlands
Dromore civil parish contains the following townlands:

Backnamullagh
Balleny
Ballykeel
Ballymacormick
Ballymaganlis
Ballynaris
Ballysallagh
Ballyvicknacally
Coolsallagh
Drumaghadone
Drumaknockan
Drumbroneth
Drumlough
Drummiller
Drumskee
Edenordinary
Edentiroory
Edentrillick
Ednego
Greenan
Greenoge
Growell
Islandderry
Killysorrell
Kinallen
Lappoges
Lisnaward
Listullycurran
Lurganbane
Magherabeg
Quilly
Skeagh
Skillyscolban
Tullindoney
Tullyglush
Tullymacarath

See also
List of civil parishes of County Down

References